Gentleman is a 1993 Indian Tamil-language action heist film co-written and directed by S. Shankar in his directorial debut, and produced by K. T. Kunjumon. The film stars Arjun, Madhubala and Subhashri, with M. N. Nambiar, Manorama, Goundamani, Senthil, Charan Raj, Vineeth, and Rajan P. Dev in supporting roles. It revolves around a respected Madras-based businessman who moonlights as a thief who steals from the rich and gives to the poor for their education.

Gentleman was released on 30 July 1993, and distributed by Kunjumon himself as distributors were reluctant. Despite this, the film became a box office success, running for over 175 days in theatres besides winning three South Filmfare Awards (including Best Film – Tamil and Best Director – Tamil), four Tamil Nadu State Film Awards (including Best Actor and Best Director) and five Cinema Express Awards. It was remade in Hindi as The Gentleman (1994). The film was breakthrough for Arjun, and established him as one of the top actors in the Tamil industry,

Plot 
In Ooty, Krishnamoorthy "Kicha" and his sidekick Mani perform a swashbuckling heist of money of several crores while being in disguise diverting the attention of police, and escape in Nilgiri Mountain Railway, much to the frustration of a chasing police officer named Ratnam. Kicha is a respected citizen who runs a legitimate papadam business along with Mani in Madras. Susheela, one of Kicha's many female employees, has a crush on him and is constantly demanding his attention. 

Another thing adding to her woes is the arrival of her jovial cousin Sugandhi. She makes the place so lively and playful with silly fights between Mani and Babloo. Sugandhi later develops a crush on Kicha, especially after being saved by him from some molesting goons. Kicha tells Sugandhi that he has no such feelings for her and wants her to find a suitable husband. Before leaving Madras, Sugandhi steals Kicha's ring as a souvenir. After several unsuccessful attempts at nabbing the thief, a disgraced police officer Azhagar Nambi shaves his head and is left with a ring mark on his face, after a scuffle with the thief. He investigates the design of the mark, believing it was formed by a ceremonial ring worn by Brahmin priests, but to his vain, finds that such a design is uncommon to Brahmin priests, but rather resembles a mangala sutra. 

Meanwhile, Nambi is forced by his parents into getting married and by coincidence to Sugandhi, from whom he gets the particular ring that he was tracking and finds out that it belongs to Kicha. In an attempt to trap and arrest Kicha, Nambi plots an attempt at Kicha's house where they were invited for a wedding dinner, hosted by Kicha, where he shoots Kicha, but the latter narrowly escapes with a bullet injury in his hand, along with Mani. Susheela follows them to their hideout, where Susheela finds the duo and accuses Kicha of his deed. After Susheela threatens to commit suicide, Kicha reveals his past: Kicha was a district-level topper along with his best friend Ramesh, and when they both were denied their desired medical college seats despite scoring high marks due to caste-based reservation and bribery, that led to the suicides of Kicha's mother and Ramesh. 

Since then, Kicha became a thief to build a college of his own, where he desires to make education available to the deserved, regardless of income, caste, or religion. To fund the final stages of the college building, aware of the police trap, Kicha makes one last attempt to steal money from the CM, resulting in success, but Nambi gains the upper hand in arresting him. In the courtroom, Kicha demands that the CM, who was previously the educational minister who demanded the bribe from him, should come to the courtroom. Though the CM is exposed to the public, he is still let off, which infuriates a youth who was inspired by Kicha's testimony. The youth kills the CM in a suicide bombing. 6 years later, Kicha and Mani, having completed their jail sentence, inaugurate Kicha's college and Kicha unites with Susheela.

Cast 

 Arjun as Krishnamoorthy (Kicha)
 Madhubala as Susheela
 Subhashri as Sugandhi
 M. N. Nambiar as Ramesh's father
 Manorama as Kicha's mother
 Goundamani as Mani
 Senthil as Babloo
 Charan Raj as Azhagar Nambi
 Gautami (special appearance in the song "Chikku Bukku Rayile")
 Prabhu Deva (special appearance in "Chikku Bukku Rayile")
 Raju (special appearance in "Chikku Bukku Rayile")
 Vineeth as Ramesh
 Rajan P. Dev as the chief minister
 Ajay Rathnam as Ratnam

 Raghava Lawrence (uncredited dancer in "Chikku Bukku Rayile")
 Rajendran as a henchman (uncredited)

Production

Development 
After scoring back-to-back successes like Vasanthakala Paravai (1991) and Surieyan (1992), producer K. T. Kunjumon of A. R. S. Film International wanted to collaborate again with director Pavithran and actor R. Sarathkumar; however since they went on to do other projects, the collaboration did not happen. Photographer Stills Ravi and editor V. T. Vijayan suggested the name of S. Shankar who worked as an assistant in these two films. Shankar had prepared a story, but it was rejected by many producers. After listening to the story, an impressed Kunjumon decided to produce the film which would later be titled Gentleman, but on the condition that Shankar accept any changes he suggest, to which Shankar agreed, making his directorial debut. While Shankar also wrote the screenplay, Kunjumon selected Balakumaran to write the dialogues. Cinematography was handled by Jeeva, editing by Vijayan and B. Lenin, and art direction by Maghi, while Vikram Dharma was the action choreographer.

Casting and filming 
Shankar wanted Kamal Haasan to play the lead role, but he refused because of the politics shown in the story and felt "it was not the right position to take on the subject". Shankar also suggested Rajasekhar to Kunjumon, but they were unsuccessful in casting him. When Arjun was approached, he was reluctant. According to him, no directors wanted to make a film with him until the success of Sevagan (1992) which was directed by Arjun himself. Therefore when Shankar approached him with the script of Gentleman, he decided to decline without listening to the script just as he did to a few other directors. But he listened to the script after much persuasion and, impressed by the story, decided to do it. The climax scene where a student kills the antagonist in a suicide bombing was inspired from the assassination of the then President of Sri Lanka, Ranasinghe Premadasa. Kunjumon insisted Shankar to rewrite the climax by adding this element, much to the dissatisfaction of Arjun, who felt that his heroism would get diluted. However, Kunjumon was adamant about the climax and it was shot as per his wish. The filming took seven months to be completed.

Soundtrack 

The score and soundtrack were composed by A. R. Rahman. Vairamuthu wrote the lyrics for all songs except "Chikku Bukku Rayile" and "Parkathey", which were written by Vaali. The songs were recorded at Panchathan Record Inn, and the soundtrack was released under the Pyramid label. The film and soundtrack were dubbed and released in Telugu with the same name. The lyrics were penned by Rajasri for this version. The original Tamil soundtrack sold over 300,000 cassettes.

The song "Ottagathai Kattiko" is often thought to have been lifted from the 1991 Telugu song, "Eddem Ante Teddam Antav", composed by Raj–Koti and sung by Malgudi Subha from the album Chik Pak Chik Bam; in reality, Rahman, who was an arranger in Raj–Koti's team, helped them in composing the original song. Once when Rahman went to visit a friend whose house was near the railway station, the sound of trains frequently disturbed their conversation; nonetheless, the train sounds inspired Rahman to compose "Chikku Bukku Rayile". "Ottagathai Kattiko" is set in the Carnatic raga known as Dharmavati, "En Veetu Thotathil" is set in Chenchurutti, "Parkathey" is set in Mohanam, and "Usalampatti Penkutti" is also set in Dharmavati.

The songs from Gentleman were reused in the Hindi remake The Gentleman (1994), though only Anu Malik was credited for the music. "Ottagathai Kattiko" was later remixed by the French rap group La Caution as "Pilotes Automatique".

Release 
Gentleman was released on 30 July 1993. Kunjumon had to distribute the film on his own since no distributors were willing to buy this film as they felt "it looked like a dubbed film". Despite this, it became a major commercial success,  running for over 175 days in theatres.

Critical reception 
Writing for The Indian Express on 6 August 1993, Malini Mannath said, "Shankar makes a promising debut infusing his script with action, sentiment, comedy and even some titillating scenes for added measure and tries to give something different within the parameters of commercial cinema. Jeeva's camera is effective in capturing the well choreographed stunt scenes (Vikram Dharma)." K. Vijiyan of New Straits Times wrote on 14 August 1993, "Sankar .. has provided thought-provoking story [..] build up the story well, making us eager to find out why the hero is committing all those robberies." On 22 August 1993, Ananda Vikatan rated the film 50 out of 100.

Accolades

Legacy 
In the 2019 Tamil film Hero, Arjun reprises his role as Sathyamoorthy (whose name is similar to Krishnamoorthy), a man who takes away money from the rich to build a school that is free for everyone. The 2021 film Dikkiloona was titled after the word used by Goundamani and Senthil in Gentleman. In June 2022, a sequel was announced with Kunjumon returning to produce, and Gokul Krishna directing.

References

Bibliography

External links 
 
 

1990s heist films
1990s Tamil-language films
1990s vigilante films
1993 action films
1993 directorial debut films
1993 films
Fictional portrayals of the Tamil Nadu Police
Films about corruption in India
Films about the education system in India
Films directed by S. Shankar
Films scored by A. R. Rahman
Films set in Chennai
Films set in Delhi
Films shot in Ooty
Indian action films
Indian heist films
Indian vigilante films
Tamil films remade in other languages